George Betts may refer to:

 George Betts (cricketer, born 1808) (1808–1861), English cricketer with amateur status
 George Betts (cricketer, born 1843) (1843–1902), English first-class cricketer